Marjoram (Origanum majorana) is a cold-sensitive perennial herb or undershrub with sweet pine and citrus flavours. In some Middle Eastern countries, marjoram is synonymous with oregano, and there the names sweet marjoram and knotted marjoram are used to distinguish it from other plants of the genus Origanum. It is also called pot marjoram, although this name is also used for other cultivated species of Origanum.

History
Marjoram is indigenous to Cyprus, the Mediterranean, Turkey, Western Asia, the Arabian Peninsula, and the Levant, and was known to the ancient Greeks and Romans as a symbol of happiness. It may have spread to the British Isles during the Middle Ages. Marjoram was not widely used in the United States until after World War II.

The name marjoram (Old French: majorane) does not directly derive from the Latin word  (major).

Marjoram is related to Samhain, the Celtic pagan holiday that would eventually become Halloween.  It has also been used in Sephardi Jewish tradition as a ritual medical practice. Ancient Greeks believed the plant was created by Aphrodite. In one myth, the royal perfumer of Cyprus, Amaracus, was transformed into marjoram. To the Romans the herb was known as the herb of happiness, and was believed to increase lifespan. Marjoram is mentioned in Pedanius Dioscorides’ De Materia Medica, and was used by Hippocrates as an antiseptic.

Today, marjoram is used largely for consumption. Its popularity may be due to the rise of low-fat and low-salt diets, which require more seasoning.

Description

The texture of the leaf is extremely smooth due to the presence of numerous hairs.

Cultivation

Considered a tender perennial (USDA Zones 7–9), marjoram can sometimes prove hardy even in zone 5. Under proper conditions it spreads prolifically, and so is usually grown in pots to prevent it from taking over a garden.

Marjoram is cultivated for its aromatic leaves, either green or dry, for culinary purposes; the tops are cut as the plants begin to flower and are dried slowly in the shade. It is often used in herb combinations such as herbes de Provence and za'atar. The flowering leaves and tops of marjoram are steam-distilled to produce an essential oil that is yellowish (darkening to brown as it ages). It has many chemical components, some of which are borneol, camphor, and pinene.

Related species
Oregano (Origanum vulgare), sometimes listed with marjoram as O. majorana, is also called wild marjoram. It has a stronger flavor than marjoram.

Pot marjoram or Cretan oregano (O. onites) has similar uses to marjoram.

Hardy marjoram or French/Italian/Sicilian marjoram (O. × majoricum), a cross of marjoram with oregano, is much more resistant to cold, but is slightly less sweet.

O. × pulchellum is known as showy marjoram or showy oregano.

Uses
Marjoram is used for seasoning soups, stews, salad dressings, sauces, and herbal teas.

Marjoram has long been used as a medicinal herb. Marjoram or marjoram oil has been used to treat cancer, colds, coughs, cramps, depression, as a diuretic, ear infections, gastrointestinal problems, headaches, and paralysis, as well as arthritis, chest congestion, and muscle aches. It has also been used as an aphrodisiac, mouthwash, tea, and in poultices, tinctures, and infusions. Though not all of its historic uses are scientifically backed, the plant has verifiable medical use. For example, it contains the phenol carvacrol, which is antibacterial, antifungal and antimicrobial. Ethanol extract is cytotoxic against fibrosarcoma cell lines, ethyl acetate extract has antiproliferative properties against C6 and HeLa cells, as have hesperetin and hydroquinone, which can be isolated from marjoram extract. Cardioprotective, hepatoprotective, antiulcerogenetic, anticholinesterase, anti-PCOS, and anti-inflammatory effects were also found in dried marjoram, marjoram tea, or in compounds extracted from marjoram. Marjoram is generally not toxic, but should not be used by pregnant or lactating women. However, it is always important to be cautious and consult a doctor when using medical herbs.

See also
Origanum vulgare

References

External links

Origanum majorana List of Chemicals in Dr. Duke's Databases
Origanum majorana in the Plants For A Future database
 

Flora of the Mediterranean Basin
Herbs
Medicinal plants
Mediterranean cuisine
Origanum
Plants described in 1753